Flight into Hell is a 1985 television miniseries about German pilot Hans Bertram and his co-pilot who go missing in 1932, based on Bertram's book of the same name, and in what was also known as 1932 Kimberley rescue.

Cast
 Helmut Zierl ... Hans Bertram
 Werner Stocker ... Adolph Klausmann
 Robin Cuming ... Captain Mitchell
 Dennis Grosvenor ... Constable Maxwell
 Gerard Kennedy ... Sgt. Steve Lucas
 Charito Ortez ... Wilhelmina
 Philip Quast ... Chris Gordon
 Anne Tenney ... Kate Webber
 Banduk Marika

References

External links
Flight into Hell at IMDb
Flight into Hell at AustLit

Australian Broadcasting Corporation original programming
1980s Australian television miniseries
1985 Australian television series debuts
1985 Australian television series endings
English-language television shows